Karius most often refers to Loris Karius, a German professional footballer.

Karius may also refer to:

People 
 Charles Karius (1893–1940), Australian explorer and magistrate 
 Wolfgang Karius (born 1943), German conductor and organist

Arts, entertainment and media

Literature 
 Karius and Bactus, Norwegian children's novel by Thorbjørn Egner